East Hickory is an unincorporated community in Forest County, Pennsylvania, United States. East Hickory has a post office with ZIP code 16321.

References

Unincorporated communities in Forest County, Pennsylvania
Unincorporated communities in Pennsylvania